The mixed doubles event  in bowling at the 2001 World Games took place from 21 to 22 August 2001 at the Utenayu Bowl in Yokote, Japan.

Competition format
A total of 24 pairs entered the competition. Best three duets from preliminary round qualifies to the finals.

Results

Preliminary

Finals

References

External links
 Results on IWGA website

Bowling at the 2001 World Games